Gymnometopina is a genus of flies belonging to the family lesser dung flies.

Species
G. apta (Curran, 1931)
G. clunicrus (Duda, 1923)
G. dudai Norrbom, 1987
G. fulgida Norrbom, 1987
G. garambaensis (Vanschuytbroeck, 1959)
G. haasae Norrbom, 1987
G. halidayi Norrbom, 1987
G. kibokoensis (Vanschuytbroeck, 1959)
G. lucida (Séguy, 1933)
G. magna Norrbom, 1987
G. marshalli Norrbom, 1987
G. richardsi Norrbom, 1987
G. scolocerca Norrbom, 1987

References

Sphaeroceridae
Diptera of Africa
Schizophora genera